The 2nd RedeX Trophy was a motor race, run to Formula One rules, held on 14 August 1954 at Snetterton Circuit, Norfolk. The race was run over 40 laps, and was won by British driver Reg Parnell in a Ferrari 625, setting fastest lap in the process. Bob Gerard in a Cooper T23-Bristol was second and Don Beauman in a Connaught Type A-Lea Francis was third.

Results

References 

Redex
Redex